Albert Edward James Matthias Bayliss (1 August 1863 – 19 August 1933), known as Jem Bayliss, was an English footballer who played for West Bromwich Albion, as well as the English national side.

He captained the West Bromwich Albion side which won the 1888 FA Cup Final.

He made his league debut on 8 September 1888, at wing-half for West Bromwich Albion in a 2–0 win against Stoke at the Victoria Ground, Stoke. He played all of the "Throstles"' 22 Football League matches and scored two goals in 1888–89. His debut League goal was scored on 22 September 1888 at Leamington Road, Blackburn, in a match that West Bromwich Albion lost to Blackburn Rovers 6–2. Bayliss also played as a forward in 1888–89.

External links

Player profile at Spartcus Educational

References

1863 births
1933 deaths
Sportspeople from Tipton
English footballers
England international footballers
Association football wing halves
Association football forwards
Great Bridge Unity F.C. players
West Bromwich Albion F.C. players
Walsall F.C. players
Wednesbury Old Athletic F.C. players
English Football League players
FA Cup Final players